The following is a list of notable events and releases of the year 1942 in Norwegian music.

Events

Deaths

 May
 2 – Alfred Evensen, musician and band leader, Norwegian Army Band (born 1883).
 23 – Harald Lie, composer (born 1902).

 September
 13 – Catharinus Elling, music teacher, organist, folk music collector and composer (born 1858).

Births

 April
 1 – Jan Fredrik Christiansen, principal trumpeter of the Oslo Philharmonic Orchestra (1973-2007).
 21 – Jon Mostad, composer.

 June
 17 – Torgrim Sollid, jazz and traditional folk trumpeter, and composer and musician.
 21 – Ditlef Eckhoff, jazz trumpeter.

 July
 4 – Jan Rohde, rock singer (died 2005).

 August
 25 – Terje Fjærn, musician, orchestra leader and musical conductor (died 2016).

 September
 5 – Björn Haugan, operatic lyric tenor (died 2009).
 25 – Arne J. Solhaug, assistant professor at Norges Musikkhøgskole, cantor of Grønland Church.

 October
 2 – Gro Sandvik, classical flautist.

 December
 23 – Grynet Molvig, actress and singer.

 Unknown date
 Richard Badendyck, Jazz singer and pianist

See also
 1942 in Norway
 Music of Norway

References

 
Norwegian music
Norwegian
Music
1940s in Norwegian music